A polyiamond (also polyamond or simply iamond, or sometimes triangular polyomino) is a polyform whose base form is an equilateral triangle. The word polyiamond is a back-formation from diamond, because this word is often used to describe the shape of a pair of equilateral triangles placed base to base, and the initial 'di-' looks like a Greek prefix meaning 'two-' (though diamond actually derives from Greek  ἀδάμας - also the basis for the word "adamant"). The name was suggested by recreational mathematics writer Thomas H. O'Beirne in New Scientist 1961 number 1, page 164.

Counting
The basic combinatorial question is, How many different polyiamonds exist with a given number of cells? Like polyominoes, polyiamonds may be either free or one-sided. Free polyiamonds are invariant under reflection as well as translation and rotation. One-sided polyiamonds distinguish reflections.

The number of free n-iamonds for n = 1, 2, 3, ... is:

1, 1, 1, 3, 4, 12, 24, 66, 160, ... .

Some authors also call the diamond (rhombus with a 60° angle) a calisson after the French sweet of similar shape.

Symmetries
Possible symmetries are mirror symmetry, 2-, 3-, and 6-fold rotational symmetry, and each combined with mirror symmetry.

2-fold rotational symmetry with and without mirror symmetry requires at least 2 and 4 triangles, respectively. 6-fold rotational symmetry with and without mirror symmetry requires at least 6 and 18 triangles, respectively. Asymmetry requires at least 5 triangles. 3-fold rotational symmetry without mirror symmetry requires at least 7 triangles.

In the case of only mirror symmetry we can distinguish having the symmetry axis aligned with the grid or rotated 30° (requires at least 4 and 3 triangles, respectively); ditto for 3-fold rotational symmetry, combined with mirror symmetry (requires at least 18 and 1 triangles, respectively).

Generalizations
Like polyominoes, but unlike polyhexes, polyiamonds have three-dimensional counterparts, formed by aggregating tetrahedra. However, polytetrahedra do not tile 3-space in the way polyiamonds can tile 2-space.

Tessellations
Every polyiamond of order 8 or less tiles the plane, except for the V-heptiamond.

Correspondence with polyhexes

Every polyiamond corresponds to a polyhex, as illustrated at right. Conversely, every polyhex is also a polyiamond, because each hexagonal cell of a polyhex is the union of six adjacent equilateral triangles. (Note, however, that neither correspondence is one-to-one.)

In popular culture
The set of 22 polyiamonds, from order 1 up to order 6, constitutes the shape of the playing pieces in the board game Blokus Trigon, where players attempt to tile a plane with as many polyiamonds as possible, subject to the game rules.

See also 
Triangular tiling
Rhombille tiling
Sphinx tiling

External links

Polyiamonds at The Poly Pages. Polyiamond tilings.
VERHEXT — a 1960s puzzle game by Heinz Haber based on hexiamonds

References

Polyforms